Juho Heikki Rannikko (17 September 1873, Mietoinen – 15 November 1933) was a Finnish farmer and politician. He was a Member of the Parliament of Finland, representing the Finnish Party from 1907 to 1916 and the National Coalition Party from 1922 to 1927.

References

1873 births
1933 deaths
People from Mynämäki
People from Turku and Pori Province (Grand Duchy of Finland)
Finnish Party politicians
National Coalition Party politicians
Members of the Parliament of Finland (1907–08)
Members of the Parliament of Finland (1908–09)
Members of the Parliament of Finland (1909–10)
Members of the Parliament of Finland (1910–11)
Members of the Parliament of Finland (1911–13)
Members of the Parliament of Finland (1913–16)
Members of the Parliament of Finland (1922–24)
Members of the Parliament of Finland (1924–27)